The Boston Bruins Radio Network is a 17-station (9 AM, 9 FM, plus 3 FM translators) network which carries live game broadcasts of the Boston Bruins. The network's flagship station is WBZ-FM/98.5-Boston, Massachusetts. Judd Sirott announces play-by-play. Bob Beers provides color commentary.

Network stations (20 stations)

Flagship (1 station)
WBZ-FM/98.5: Boston (2009–present)

Affiliates (19 stations)

Maine (3 stations)
WEZQ/92.9: Bangor (2012–present)
WEZR/780: Rumford
WHXR/106.3: Scarborough

Massachusetts (7 stations + 2 FM translators)
WBEC/1420: Pittsfield
WVEI/1440: Worcester
WMRC/1490: Milford
WNAW/1230: North Adams (2012–present)
WPKZ/1280: Fitchburg (2011–present)
WXTK/95.1: West Yarmouth/Cape Cod (2011–present)
WWEI/105.5: Easthampton
W267CD/101.3: Milford (rebroadcasts WMRC)
W287BT/105.3: Fitchburg (rebroadcasts WPKZ)

New Hampshire (4 stations + 1 FM translator)
WEEY/93.5: Swanzey (2012–present)
WTPL/107.7: Hillsborough
WTSN/1270: Dover (2015–present)
WWLK-FM/101.5: Meredith
W251CF/98.1: Dover (rebroadcasts WTSN)

New York (2 stations)
WCPV/101.3: Essex (2011–present)
WEAV/960: Plattsburgh

Rhode Island (2 stations)
WVEI-FM/103.7 Westerly (2014–present). WVEI-FM has been announced as the Providence affiliate starting with the 2014-2015 season.
WOON/1240: Woonsocket (2010–present)

Vermont (1 station + 1 F.M. translator
WCFR/1320: Springfield, Vermont
W293BH/106.5 (relays WCFR)

Former flagships (7 stations)
WBZ/1030: Boston (1924-1929; 1969-1978; 1995-2009; also simulcast Game 7 of the 2011 Stanley Cup Finals)
WBNW/590: Boston (1990-1995; now WEZE; station was known as WEEI from 1990 to 1994)
WPLM-FM/99.1: Plymouth, Massachusetts (1982-1990)
WITS/1510: Boston (1978-1982; now WMEX)
WHDH/850: Boston (1946-1969; now WEEI)
WNAC/1230 (until March 29, 1941); 1260 (after March 29, 1941; station later moved to 680): Boston (1929-1935; 1942-1946; now WRKO)
WAAB/1410 (until March 29, 1941); 1440 (after March 29, 1941): Boston (1935-1942; now WVEI)

Former affiliates (29 stations)
WARA/1320: Attleboro, Massachusetts (1990-1991)
WBAE/1490: Portland, Maine (regular season)
WBCQ-FM/94.7: Monticello, Maine (2012-?)
WBET/1460 Brockton, Massachusetts (1978-1990; now WBMS)
WBSM/1420: New Bedford, Massachusetts (2010–20??)
WCME/900: Brunswick, Maine (2013–?)
WEAN-FM/99.7: Wakefield-Peacedale, Rhode Island (2013 Stanley Cup Championship only)
WGAM/1250: Manchester, New Hampshire
WGAW/1340: Gardner, Massachusetts (2011-2012 season)
WGHM/900: Nashua, New Hampshire
WHLL/1450: Springfield, Massachusetts
WLYT/92.5 Haverhill, Massachusetts (1978-1990; now WXRV; station was known as WHAV-FM from 1978 to 1982)
WMYF/1380: Portsmouth, New Hampshire (2012-2015; later WPLA; now defunct)
WMEX/106.5: Farmington, New Hampshire (????-2008; now WNHI, part of the Air 1 satellite network)
WOXO-FM/92.7: Norway, Maine (2012-?)
WPRO/630: Providence, Rhode Island (2013 Stanley Cup Championship only)
WPRV/790: Providence, Rhode Island (2011-2013)
WSAR/1480: Fall River, Massachusetts
WSMN/1590: Nashua, New Hampshire (2012–?)
WSNO/1450: Barre, Vermont
WTBM/100.7: Mexico, Maine (now WIGY-FM)
WTSL/1400: Hanover, New Hampshire (2012–?)
WTSV/1230: Claremont, New Hampshire (2012–?)
WVAE/1400: Biddeford, Maine
WVMT/620 Burlington, Vermont (2010-2011)
WWOD/93.9: Woodstock, Vermont (?-2012)
WWON/1240: Woonsocket, Rhode Island (1984–1985; now WOON)
WZAN/970: Portland, Maine (?-2012; Playoffs only)
WZON/620: Bangor, Maine (?-2012)

References

External links
List of radio affiliates

 http://boston.cbslocal.com/bruins-radio-network/

National Hockey League on the radio
Sports radio networks in the United States